The State of New Mexico has a total of fifteen micropolitan areas. As of the 2000 Census, these counties had a combined population of 589,371 (32.4% of the state's total population). Based on a July 1, 2009 population estimate, that figure had increased to 597,079 (29.7% of the state's total population).

Micropolitan areas

1 - part of the Clovis-Portales combined statistical area
2 - part of the Albuquerque-Santa Fe-Las Vegas combined statistical area

Population statistics

See also
List of metropolitan areas in New Mexico
List of cities in New Mexico
New Mexico census statistical areas
Table of United States primary census statistical areas (PCSA)
Table of United States Combined Statistical Areas (CSA)
Table of United States Metropolitan Statistical Areas (MSA)
Table of United States Micropolitan Statistical Areas (μSA)

References

 

Demographics of New Mexico
Micropolitan areas